Interstate 49 (I-49) is a north–south Interstate Highway that exists in multiple segments: the original portion entirely within the state of Louisiana with an additional signed portion extending from I-220 in Shreveport to the Arkansas state line, three newer sections in Arkansas, and a new section that opened in Missouri. Its southern terminus is in Lafayette, Louisiana, at I-10 while its northern terminus is in Kansas City, Missouri, at I-435 and I-470. Portions of the remaining roadway in Louisiana, Arkansas, and Texas, which will link Kansas City with New Orleans, are in various stages of planning or construction.

Although not part of the original 1957 Interstate Highway plan, residents of Missouri, Arkansas, and Louisiana began campaigning for the highway in 1965 via the "US 71 - I-29 Association". The campaign called for I-29 to be extended south from Kansas City to New Orleans following much of the route along U.S. Route 71 (US 71). The plan called for creating a limited access expressway from New Orleans to the Canadian border and on to Winnipeg (via Manitoba Highway 75). When I-49 is complete, the goal of the association will have been accomplished, with only a brief gap (served by other Interstates or US 71) and route number change in Kansas City.

Route description

|-
|LA
|
|-
|AR
|
|-
|MO
|
|-
|Total
|
|}

Louisiana

The current southern terminus of I-49 is located at a cloverleaf interchange with I-10 and US 167 in the southern Louisiana city of Lafayette. Southbound motorists continue through the interchange onto the Evangeline Thruway, which transitions from a limited-access portion of US 167 to a major divided thoroughfare that picks up the US 90 corridor heading through the heart of Lafayette. I-49 begins its journey concurrent with US 167 as it travels northward through Carencro, Sunset, Grand Coteau, and Opelousas. US 167 departs from the Interstate's alignment at exit 23 between Opelousas and Washington, and I-49 begins to take a northwesterly path through the heavily wooded rural terrain. Various state highways provide access to the small towns and cities located along the parallel US 71 and US 167 corridors, such as Lebeau, Ville Platte, Bunkie, and Cheneyville. After crossing US 167, I-49 travels between US 71 and US 165 into the Alexandria metropolitan area in central Louisiana.

I-49 travels through downtown Alexandria doubling as U.S. Highway 71 Bypass (US 71 Byp.) and is also concurrent with portions of US 167 and Louisiana Highway 28 (LA 28). Major interchanges with US 167 and US 71 lead to bridges that cross the Red River into the neighboring city of Pineville. Continuing northwest from Alexandria, I-49 parallels the Red River and LA 1 through Boyce and passes just west of the historic city of Natchitoches, which is reached via LA 6 at exit 138. Between Natchitoches and Shreveport, I-49 travels between LA 1 and US 171 and has junctions with US 371 and US 84, connecting with Coushatta and Mansfield, respectively.

In Shreveport, the Interstate heads directly into the downtown area and terminates at I-20, a route that facilitates eastbound traffic. LA 3132 is a western freeway bypass of Shreveport known as the Inner Loop Expressway that becomes I-220 upon intersecting I-20. On the northside of town, motorists may exit I-220 and follow the next segment of I-49, which parallels US 71 into Arkansas.

The heaviest traffic on I-49 occurs within the cities of Shreveport and Opelousas. The stretch of freeway in Shreveport sees an average of 70,000 vehicles per day, while the stretch of freeway between Lafayette and Carencro sees an average of 55,000 vehicles per day, and the stretch of freeway through Opelousas sees an average of 45,000 vehicles per day between the Judson Walsh Drive and Creswell Lane exits.

Arkansas

I-49 in Arkansas is composed of three disconnected segments: northern, southern, and a short connector skirting Fort Smith near Fort Chaffee.

The southern segment of I-49 enters Arkansas from Louisiana. The short segment progresses northward to a temporary terminus at US 71 and US 59 at the Texas state line north of Texarkana.

The northern segment of I-49 in Arkansas, most of which was formerly signed as part of I-540, begins at I-40 in Alma and runs north to Northwest Arkansas through the Boston Mountains. The freeway passes through steep, sparsely populated terrain before entering the Bobby Hopper Tunnel in Washington County. Entering Northwest Arkansas, I-49 has seven exits for Fayetteville and three exits for Springdale before entering Benton County. The route serves as the boundary between Bentonville and Rogers, with seven exits for the two cities. After an interchange with US 71 just south of the Bentonville–Bella Vista city line, I-49 follows the Bella Vista Bypass, which runs to the south and west of Bella Vista before crossing into Missouri.

I-49 is designated as the Boston Mountains Scenic Loop between Alma and Fayetteville. The I-49 designation replaced the I-540 designation through Northwest Arkansas in March 2014, with the exception of the Bella Vista Bypass, which was constructed between July 2011 and October 2021.

Missouri

I-49 enters Missouri from Arkansas on the Bella Vista Bypass, eventually reuniting with US 71 south of Pineville. Continuing northward, I-49 passes through several smaller communities, including Neosho, before reaching Joplin. In Joplin, I-49 junctions with I-44 and begins a short concurrency with I-44 for exits 11 through 18.

Just a few miles east of Joplin, I-49 leaves I-44 and heads north and enters Carthage, intersecting with Interstate 49 Business (I-49 Bus.)/Route 171, which provides an alternate route for northbound I-49 travelers through Joplin. I-49 then passes through Nevada and other communities before reaching the Kansas City area. I-49 intersects with I-470 and I-435, which provides connection to I-70, I-35, and I-29.

In south Kansas City, at Bannister Road just north of the Grandview Triangle, the I-49 designation ends, and the freeway continues as Interstate 435 north to I-70 west and the expressway continues as US 71, which proceeds into downtown Kansas City as Bruce R. Watkins Memorial Drive.

History

Louisiana
The original plans for the Interstate Highway System did not include a north–south connection between I-10 and I-20 within Louisiana. In 1965, Governor John McKeithen proposed a toll road to perform this function and extend it to New Orleans as well, but the idea was never carried out. In the mid-1970s, the Federal Highway Administration (FHWA) approved an Interstate Highway to run between US 190 in Opelousas and I-20 in Shreveport, a route that was designated as I-49 by the American Association of State Highway and Transportation Officials (AASHTO) in the summer of 1977. In 1981, AASHTO approved a slight extension of the designation along the existing route of US 167 from Opelousas south to I-10 in Lafayette. In its early history, I-49 was commonly referred to as the North–South Expressway.

Construction of I-49 began in 1981 between Opelousas and the small town of Washington. This segment joined the portion running concurrent with US 167, an existing limited-access highway, and was completed by 1983. By the following year, virtually all remaining rural portions of the route were under construction, and 95 percent of this mileage was completed and opened to traffic between late 1987 and late 1989. The remaining portions running through the urban centers of Alexandria and Shreveport required a much greater expenditure of time and funding. The entire length of the  road was completed on May 1, 1996, with the opening of a  section in downtown Alexandria named the Martin Luther King Jr. Highway. The total cost of I-49's construction was about $1.38 billion (equivalent to $ in ).

"Interstate 49 North" was a  construction project that extended the highway from I-20 in Shreveport to the Arkansas state line and was divided into 11 segments. On November 27, 2013, the first  section between LA 1 and US 71 opened to traffic, and the extension to a point just south of the Arkansas state line opened in March 2014. On May 31, 2017, a  portion between LA 3194 (Martin Luther King Jr. Drive) and LA 1 in Shreveport was opened to northbound traffic.  On June 15, 2018, the entire  portion of I-49 between I-220 and LA 1, including an interchange with I-220, was opened to traffic. The remaining interchange ramps opened to traffic on October 17, 2018.

Arkansas and Missouri
Arkansas and Missouri pursued an I-49 designation for US 71 and I-540 for many years. In the early 2000s, there were plans by both states to rename the roadway as such between I-44 west of Joplin and I-40 at Fort Smith once a new bypass of US 71 had been completed around Bella Vista, Arkansas, and north to Pineville, Missouri. However, the AASHTO Special Committee on U.S. Route Numbers and Interstate Highways denied the I-49 designation at their annual meeting in September 2007 because none of the new roadway was yet under construction. During this time, there was also some debate as to whether the I-29 designation should be extended farther south from its current terminus in Kansas City to either Joplin or all the way to Fort Smith.

The designation applies to current US 71 between I-435 in south Kansas City and Route H at Pineville (McDonald County), which was expanded to Interstate standards beginning in 2010. The last of the expansion projects was completed in December 2012. I-49 also runs concurrently with I-44 between exits 11 and 18 east of Joplin.

The Missouri Department of Transportation (MoDOT) began installing I-49 trailblazer signage (without shields) along with gantry signs and milemarkers, about 1200 signs in all, in February 2012. Signage bearing I-49 shields was covered or turned from view until the I-49 designation received final approval by FHWA. This includes milemarkers at  intervals along the entire alignment apart from I-44.

The US 71 expansion involved removing all at-grade intersections and constructing interchanges and overpasses at 15 sites between Harrisonville and Lamar. The two-year project represented a shift in funding priorities for MoDOT, which, in 2007, announced the indefinite postponement of its portion of the Bella Vista bypass project, citing a $139-million (equivalent to $ in ) funding gap in Arkansas between construction costs and toll revenues, and Arkansas's commitment to only a two-lane bypass constructed over six years. MoDOT announced the Joplin-to-Kansas City expansion of US 71 in August 2010, to be done with the intention of bringing the I-49 designation to Missouri.

Most of the  corridor in Kansas City, constructed between 1990 and 2001, was built to Interstate standards. However, three at-grade intersections—at Gregory Boulevard (71st Street), 59th Street, and 55th Street—prevent the I-49 designation from being extended all the way to downtown. All three of these intersections were on the Kansas City Police Department's 2010 list of "Top 20 Crash Sites in Kansas City", at #9, #6 and #4, respectively, and Watkins Drive has the reputation among commuters as "one of the city's most accident-prone stretches of road". Many neighborhood associations in Kansas City have historically objected to expanding Watkins Drive to a freeway. MoDOT has gone on record stating a court order keeps them from removing the stoplights, making conversion of this stretch unlikely. A MoDOT blog post says "Ample right of way was acquired to someday allow MoDOT to reconstruct the three signal-controlled, at-grade intersections to grade-separated interchanges, allowing traffic on Bruce R. Watkins Drive to flow unimpeded. Neither MoDOT nor the city of Kansas City can initiate this change. It is up to the citizens, who must raise the issue again through the court system to amend the class-action agreement."

The I-49 designation carries through the Three Trails Crossing (aka the Grandview Triangle) interchange to guide motorists onto US 71 north of I-435 and terminates north of I-435 and south of Bannister Road (Route W) around the 190.0 mile marker. From this point north, US 71 follows Bruce R. Watkins Drive, a parkway which directly connects the I-70/I-670 interchange in downtown Kansas City, as well as the I-35/I-29/I-70 interchange just to the north, to south Kansas City and I-435, I-470, and I-49.

I-130, a former future designation from 1999–2000, was removed and no longer exists as part of the Texarkana Loop.

Southern Arkansas segment

A temporary designation of Highway 549 had been assigned to I-49 between US 71 north of Texarkana and Doddridge,  from the state line.

I-49 has now been completed to the state line. "Future I-49" segments extending northward from Texarkana, Arkansas, plus segments from Doddridge south into Louisiana were shown on the official Arkansas 2013 Highway Map.

The route was completed and signed as I-49 in late 2014.

Bella Vista Bypass

Motorists were eager for the completion of the  "Bella Vista Bypass" between Bella Vista, Arkansas, and Pineville, Missouri.

A major hurdle to the construction of the bypass over the years was funding. The 2010 TIGER grant application submitted by the Arkansas Highway and Transportation Department (AHTD) estimated the total cost for completion in Arkansas as $291.8 million (equivalent to $ in ). The document states the portion of the bypass in Arkansas is "proposed to be constructed as a toll facility, while the Missouri portion of the Bypass will be constructed as a free route".

Groundbreaking occurred on July 8, 2011, with a public ceremony that included Transportation Secretary Ray LaHood, Arkansas Governor Mike Beebe, and Senator Mark Pryor. The USDOT news release refers to the project as part of the "I-49 corridor", effectively ending questions about how the new highway would be numbered. The following year, the segment between AR 72 north and County Road 34 was let. , AHTD anticipated completion of this first segment between AR 72 north and AR 72 south in spring 2014, and the next section in autumn 2014. AR 549 between AR 72 and County Road 34 opened on August 22, 2015.

Following the passing of a ten-year half-cent sales tax measure in 2012, AHTD had acquired sufficient additional revenue to fund the southbound half of the Bella Vista Bypass without tolls. Since design work had been completed prior to passing the measure, AHTD was able to let the segment between AR 72 and U.S. Highway 71 Business (US 71B) in February 2014 as the first job of the Connecting Arkansas Program. AHTD anticipated completion of this project in 2016.

In 2012, Missouri still had $40 million (equivalent to $ in ) available for construction of its portion of the Bella Vista bypass from Pineville to the Arkansas state line. MoDOT's I-49 project manager said in an interview that "[MoDOT has] told Arkansas that whatever schedule it sets, we will meet them at the state line." However, once Arkansas began building toward the state line, it was revealed that Missouri was $25 million (equivalent to $ in ) short of the necessary funds to complete their section. A ballot initiative was defeated in August 2014 in Missouri, which put the project on hold for nearly five years.

The only Arkansas project remaining for a fully operational two-lane bypass was the  section between County Road 34 and the Missouri state line; however, was is listed as TBD by AHTD. Design work was complete for the roadway project and was anticipated to be complete in 2015 for the interchange. Construction of the roadway was anticipated to be complete in 2017, assuming a one-year delay related to Missouri funding. Construction on the interchange was tentatively scheduled to be complete in 2018. The final segment from Rocky Dell Hollow Road to the Missouri border was scheduled to be completed with all four lanes by late 2021 to meet up with the Missouri segment. Widening this segment was begun in 2020.

On May 10, 2017, a  segment of the bypass between the existing  segment near Hiwasse, Arkansas, and a new temporary roundabout interchange with I-49 and US 71 near Bentonville, Arkansas, opened after three years of construction and costed over $50 million (equivalent to $ in ) to complete.

In March 2019, the Missouri Highways and Transportation Commission approved funding for the completion of the Bella Vista Bypass. Construction bids were approved in early April 2020, and construction currently is expected to finish in Arkansas by late 2021. The remaining  in Missouri were also slated to be completed by late 2021. Once Missouri completes this portion, the gap would be closed, and four contiguous lanes of freeway from the Kansas City region to the Fort Smith area will be completed. The Bella Vista Bypass opened to traffic on October 1, 2021.

Future

Southern Louisiana segment
The Louisiana Department of Transportation and Development (DOTD) is working to extend I-49 from Lafayette southeast to New Orleans along the route of US 90, which is a divided four-lane highway between the two cities. Some portions, such as the freeway between Morgan City and the Raceland area, are already built to Interstate standards.

In the Lafayette area, the project is divided into two projects, the I-49 Lafayette Connector and the expansion of US 90 from Lafayette Regional Airport to the LA 88 interchange. The I-49 Lafayette Connector is currently undergoing a Supplemental Environmental Impact Statement study and Conceptual Design Study due to refinements to the alignment originally approved in the February 2003 Record of Decision. It is planned to be a six-lane elevated freeway, mostly utilizing the Evangeline Thruway corridor, except for a segment paralleling the BNSF/Union Pacific railroad line in order to serve the downtown area. The rest of the freeway from the airport to LA 88 will be an at-grade six-lane freeway with a  segment of eight-lane elevated freeway through the suburb of Broussard.

Much of US 90 between LA 88 and the Wax Lake Outlet bridge west of Patterson is already widened to Interstate standards, except for an at-grade intersection with LA 318 south of Jeanerette. Construction is now underway to convert that intersection to a grade-separated interchange with frontage roads for local access. From Wax Lake to the Atchafalaya River bridge at Morgan City, US 90 is a four-lane divided at-grade expressway. A Supplemental EIS is ongoing to expand that segment to interstate standards.

The Raceland–New Orleans segment of the proposed I-49 South was originally approved in 2008 with a Record of Decision for a fully elevated freeway on a mostly new alignment along the entire length. However, in 2014, DOTD launched a study to consider less expensive alternatives and to expedite design and construction of that segment. The resulting design changes greatly reduced costs by incorporating much of the existing US 90 corridor, save for bypasses of Des Allemands and Paradis, as well as a revised connection with I-310/LA 3127. A Supplemental EIS is ongoing for that segment to finalize these changes.

In the immediate New Orleans area, I-49 is planned to follow the route of US 90 Bus., much of which is an elevated freeway. US 90 Bus. follows the Westbank Expressway through Westwego, Gretna, and Algiers. It then crosses Crescent City Connection over the Mississippi River into Downtown New Orleans and continues onto the Pontchartrain Expressway to an interchange with I-10. "Future I-49" signage is visible along US 90 and US 90 Bus., although, construction has yet to begin.

Shreveport segment
In addition to the southern extension, Louisiana officials are also working on the completion of I-49 from Shreveport to the Arkansas state line. Options for the remaining gap between I-20 and I-220 in Shreveport include the proposed Inner-City Connector, a  direct connection between the completed portions of I-49. A no-build proposal is to reroute I-49 onto existing portions of LA 3132 (Inner Loop Expressway) and I-220 through Shreveport.

Texas
North of Texarkana, I-49 will briefly venture into Texas for about  before turning northwest, meeting I-369, and crossing the Red River of the South to re-enter Arkansas. How the mileposts and the exits will be numbered once the Interstate returns to Arkansas have yet to be determined.

Central Arkansas segment
The  section between Texarkana and Fort Smith remains largely incomplete. Right-of-way has been acquired and engineering has been completed, but construction is contingent upon allocating funding to the corridor. After applying for and receiving assistance from the 2012 TIGER grant program, ArDOT began construction on the new path for I-49 towards US 71 south of Fort Smith, bypassing Van Buren and Fort Smith. Work is now complete between US 71 and AR 22 near Fort Chaffee as the first and southernmost phase of the extension of I-49 bypassing I-540. The project is explicitly mentioned as an effort to complete I-49 in the TIGER grant application. Colloquially referred to as "Chaffee Crossing", this first phase was completed on July 15, 2015, at the AR 549 and AR 22 Interchange. I-49 is planned to follow the general route of US 71 through the state between I-30 and I-40. I-49 between AR 22 and I-40 is in development. Construction is scheduled to begin in 2024.

Junction list
Louisiana
  in Lafayette. I-49 and US 167 travel concurrently to a point between Opelousas and Washington.
  east of Opelousas
  south of Lecompte
  in Alexandria. I-49 and US 167 travel concurrently into downtown Alexandria.
  in Alexandria
  southwest of Coushatta
  west of Grand Bayou
  in Shreveport. Freeway carrying through traffic bound for I-20 west and northern segment of I-49.
  in Shreveport
 Gap in route
  in Shreveport
  between Gilliam and Hosston
Arkansas
  south-southeast of Doddridge
  south of Fouke
  in Texarkana
  in Texarkana
  in Texarkana
  in Texarkana
Arkansas–Texas line
  north of Texarkana
Texas
 Gap in route
Arkansas
  in Fort Smith
 Gap in route
  in Alma
  in Fayetteville. The highways travel concurrently to Bentonville.
  in Fayetteville. The highways travel concurrently to Bentonville.
  in Springdale
  in Bentonville
Missouri
  south of Pineville. The highways travel concurrently to Kansas City.
  in Neosho
  south-southwest of Duenweg. The highways travel concurrently to Fidelity.
  in Lamar
  in Nevada
  in Kansas City

See also

References

External links

Interstate Guide: I-49
I-49 Energy Corridor 
I-49 North (Louisiana Department of Transportation and Development)
I-49 Report 
Interstate49.org
I-49 Inner-City Connector-Shreveport
I-49 Inner City Connector map(Shreveport, LA)
I-49 Connector (Lafayette, LA)
Future I-49 South Pictures (Stephen Gantry)
Future I-49 South Pictures (Andy P. Jung)
Arkansas Highway & Transportation Dept. - Bella Vista Bypass 
I-49 Lafayette Connector
DOTD-launched study on Raceland–New Orleans I-49 segment 

 
49
49
Transportation in Bowie County, Texas